Bakovci is a village in the Municipality of Murska Sobota in the Prekmurje region in northeastern Slovenia.

References

External links
Bakovci on Geopedia

Populated places in the City Municipality of Murska Sobota